Banco Español de Crédito SA v Camino (2012) Case C-618/10 is a case relevant for European contract law concerning the scope of consumer protection in the Unfair Terms Directive under EU law.

Facts
Calderon Camino borrowed €30,000 from Banesto to buy a car at 7.95% interest, and APR 8.89%, and 29% on late payments. Banesto claimed €29,381.95 for unpaid monthly repayments, interest and costs.

First instance held the 29% rate to be automatically unfair, given it was 20% above the nominal, fixing the rate instead at 19%. Banesto complained that the consumer had not asked for this, and said national law prevented a court assessing a term for unfairness on its own motion. The Barcelona Provincial Court referred the question to the ECJ.

Judgment
The European Court of Justice's First Chamber held that the court had the right and the duty to assess the fairness of a clause. However, it could not substitute an interest rate: it had to find the interest rate void, while leaving the rest of the contract intact.

See also

English contract law
EU law

Notes

References

Contract case law
Spanish case law
Court of Justice of the European Union case law
2012 in the European Union
2012 in case law